The functions of local government in the Republic of Ireland are mostly exercised by thirty-one local authorities, termed County, City, or City and County Councils. The principal decision-making body in each of the thirty-one local authorities is composed of the members of the council, elected by universal franchise in local elections every five years from multi-seat local electoral areas using the single transferable vote. Many of the authorities' statutory functions are, however, the responsibility of ministerially appointed career officials termed Chief executives. The competencies of the city and county councils include planning, transport infrastructure, sanitary services, public safety (notably fire services) and the provision of public libraries. Each local authority sends representatives to one of three Regional Assemblies.

Local government in the state is governed by Local Government Acts 1925 to 2019, the principal act of which is the Local Government Act 2001. The Local Government (Ireland) Act 1898 is the founding document of the present system. The Twentieth Amendment of the Constitution of Ireland (1999) provided for constitutional recognition of local government for the first time in Ireland in a new Article 28A. The Local Government Reform Act 2014 changed the structure by the abolition of all town councils and the merger of certain county councils. The reforms came into effect in 2014, to coincide with that year's local elections.

Historical development

The county was a unit of judicial and administrative government introduced to Ireland following the Norman invasion. The country was shired in a number of phases with County Wicklow being the last to be shired in 1625. The traditional county of Tipperary was split into two judicial counties (or ridings) following the establishment of assize courts in 1838. At various times in the past, other entities at a level below that of the county or county borough have been employed in Ireland for various judicial, administrative and revenue collecting purposes. Some of these, such as the barony and Grand jury, no longer fulfil their original purpose while retaining only vestigial legal relevance in the modern state. Others, such as the poor law unions, have been transformed into entities still in use by the modern state, but again, their original functions have been substantially altered.

Sixty years later, a more radical reorganisation of local government took place with the Local Government (Ireland) Act 1898. This Act established a county council for each of the thirty-three Irish counties and ridings (County Tipperary was divided with North Riding and South Riding). County boroughs in each of the cities were separate from the counties. Below the county level were urban districts and municipal boroughs, town commissioners and rural districts. The geographic remit of the Irish Free State, established in December 1922 pursuant to the Anglo-Irish Treaty of 1921, was confined to twenty-six of the traditional counties of Ireland, which included 27 administrative counties and four county boroughs.

Rural districts were abolished everywhere except County Dublin in 1925, and in County Dublin in 1930.

In 1994 County Dublin and the Borough of Dún Laoghaire were abolished with their administrative areas being divided among three new counties: Dún Laoghaire–Rathdown, Fingal and South Dublin. The state was divided into 8 Regional Authorities.

The Local Government Act 2001 simplified the local government structure, with the principal tier of local government (county and city councils) covering the entire territory of the state and having general responsibility for all functions of local government except in 80 towns within the territory of county councils, where the lower tier (town councils) existed with more limited functions. The five county boroughs of Dublin, Cork, Galway, Waterford, and Limerick were re-styled city councils, with the same status in law as county councils. The lower-level tiers of borough corporations, urban district councils and Town commissioners were reduced to a single tier of town council, with five permitted to retain the title of borough council: the city of Kilkenny and the four towns of Sligo, Drogheda, Clonmel, and Wexford.

The Local Government Reform Act 2014 enacted changes which took effect after the 2014 local elections:
Town councils and borough councils were abolished
All counties outside Dublin were divided into municipal districts, with county councillors also being district councillors.
Limerick City Council and Limerick County Council were dissolved and succeeded by Limerick City and County Council.
Waterford City Council and Waterford County Council were dissolved and succeeded by Waterford City and County Council.
North Tipperary County Council and South Tipperary County Council were dissolved and succeeded by Tipperary County Council.
Councillors' power to overturn planning decisions was removed.
Local services funded by the property tax.
The 8 Regional Authorities were dissolved and their functions transferred to the Regional Assemblies.

The civic and ceremonial status of existing cities, boroughs and larger towns was retained after being merged with counties. Those municipal districts that included existing cities or boroughs merged became either "metropolitan districts" or "borough districts". They continue to have mayors as do those districts containing county towns. In all other councils the equivalent office is known as Chair or Cathaoirleach. Each municipal district was issued with a new statutory charter setting out its powers alongside any historic charters that already existed.

Proposed reforms
An election for a directly elected mayor for Limerick City and County Council was reportedly planned for 2021. As of April 2021, these plans had been deferred, with legislation required before such an election could take place.  it was reported that a vote on the required legislation was proposed to occur "in the second half of the year [2022]".

On 6 June 2018, the government announced that Galway City Council and Galway County Council were to be merged into a single local authority by 2021. As of late 2021, this proposal was reportedly "off the agenda".

County and city councils

European Union territorial divisions

Eurostat, the statistical Directorate-General of the European Union, uses a geographical hierarchy system called the Nomenclature of Territorial Units for Statistics (NUTS) for various statistical and financial disbursement purposes. The entirety of Ireland is a First-level NUTS of the European Union. The Second level (NUTS 2) divides Ireland into three Regions. The Third level (NUTS 3) divides these Regions again, with total of 8 regions in Ireland. Below this are local administrative units (LAUs) which are the basic statistical components for the regions; in Ireland these are the local electoral areas (LEAs). Electoral divisions have no local government functions, and are used solely for statistical purposes and for defining electoral boundaries.

Funding
Following the abolition of domestic property rates in the late 1970s, local councils found it extremely difficult to raise money. The shortfall from the abolition of property rates led to the introduction of service charges for water and refuse, but these were highly unpopular in certain areas and led in certain cases to large-scale non-payment. Arising from a decision made by the Rainbow Government domestic water charges were abolished on 1 January 1997 placing further pressure on local government funding.

The Department of Finance is a significant source of funding at present, and additional sources are rates on commercial and industrial property, housing rents, service charges and borrowing. The dependence on Exchequer has led to charges that Ireland has an overly centralised system of local government.

Over the past three decades numerous studies carried out by consultants on behalf of the Government have recommended the reintroduction of some form of local taxation/charging regime, but these were generally seen as politically unacceptable. However, in 2012 the Local Government Management Agency was established to provide a central data management service to enable the collection of the Home Charge, the Non Principle Private Residence (NPPR) charge and the proposed water charge.

Since 1999, motor tax is paid into the Local Government Fund, established by the Local Government Act 1998, and is distributed on a "Needs and Resources" basis.

In 2013, a local property tax was introduced to provide funding for local authorities.

Responsibilities
Local government has progressively lost control over services to national and regional bodies, particularly since the foundation of the state in 1922. For instance, local control of education has largely been passed to Education and Training Boards, while other bodies such as the Department of Education and Skills still hold significant powers. In 1970 local government lost its health remit, which had been already eroded by the creation of the Department of Health in 1947, to the Health Board system. In the 1990s the National Roads Authority took overall authority for national roads projects, supported by local authorities who maintain the non-national roads system. The whole area of waste management has been transformed since the 1990s, with a greater emphasis on environmental protection, recycling infrastructure and higher environmental standards. In 1993 the Environmental Protection Agency was established to underpin a more pro-active and co-ordinated national and local approach to protecting the environment. An Bord Pleanála was seen as another inroad into local government responsibilities. Additionally, the trend has been to remove decision-making from elected councillors to full-time professionals and officials. In particular, every city and county has a manager, who is the chief executive but is also a public servant appointed by the Public Appointments Service (formerly the Civil Service and Local Appointments Commission), and is thus answerable to the national government as well as the local council. Therefore, local policy decisions are sometimes heavily influenced by the TDs who represent the local constituency in Dáil Éireann (the main chamber of parliament), and may be dictated by national politics rather than local needs.

Local government bodies now have responsibility for such matters as planning, local roads, sanitation, and libraries. The Minister for Housing, Planning and Local Government has responsibility for local authorities and related services. Fingal County Manager David O'Connor: "Local Authorities perform both a representational and an operational role because the Irish system of Local Government encompasses both democratic representation and public administration."

See also
Local government in Dublin
Twentieth Amendment of the Constitution of Ireland
:Category:Local councillors in the Republic of Ireland
Local government in Northern Ireland

References

Bibliography
Mark Callanan and Justin F. Keogan, Local Government in Ireland Inside Out (2003)
Matthew Potter, The Government and the People of Limerick. The History of Limerick Corporation/City Council 1197–2006 (2006)
Desmond Roche, Local Government in Ireland (1982)

External links
List of Local Authorities
Association of County and City Councils
Local Government Management Agency
Local Government Overview
City Mayors article
 Performance Matters Measuring Performance in Local Government in Ireland — Our Experience So Far

 
 
Department of Housing, Local Government and Heritage